Timothy Callan (born 6 January 1984) is a former Australian rules football player for the Western Bulldogs, and the Geelong Football Club. He is the son of former Geelong player, Terry Callan.

Career

Geelong
Callan was selected by Geelong in the 2002 AFL Draft, under the father-son rule. A small/medium-sized defender, Callan is renowned for his consistent displays of courage and bravery during the game, often backing into packs for marks or spoils. Although he has proven himself as one of the better players for the club's VFL side for numerous seasons, he has struggled to get consistent games in the senior side for the Cats.

Western Bulldogs
Looking for a more permanent role in a senior team, Callan was traded along with pick 66 to the Western Bulldogs on 9 October 2007 during the official trade week for the Bulldogs pick 62 in the national draft.

Callan's career at the Bulldogs started off very strongly, playing a key part in the Bulldogs' first seven (undefeated) rounds.

Newtown and Chilwell
Played a season with The Geelong football league club before retiring after the 2011 season. 

Callan retired at the end of the 2010 season.

Statistics
 Statistics are correct to end of 2007 season

References

External links

Western Bulldogs players
Geelong Football Club players
1984 births
Living people
Australian rules footballers from Victoria (Australia)
Geelong Falcons players
St Joseph's Football Club players
People educated at Geelong College